Akito Y. Kawahara is an American and Japanese entomologist, scientist, and advocate of nature education, and the son of the modern conceptual artist On Kawara.

Kawahara is a Professor and Curator at the University of Florida and lead researcher at the Florida Museum of Natural History's McGuire Center for Lepidoptera and Biodiversity. He also holds the position of Research Associate at the Smithsonian Institution, National Museum of Natural History.

Education 

Kawahara received his bachelor's degree from Cornell University in 2002 and his Ph.D. from the University of Maryland with Dr. Charles Mitter through the Smithsonian Institution, National Museum of Natural History in 2010. He was a National Science Foundation Postdoctoral Fellow at the University of Hawaii, Manoa before starting his position at the University of Florida.

Career 

Kawahara's research interests are insect evolution, predator-prey interactions, and genetics. He has published over 175 peer-reviewed scientific papers, and has received many national and international awards. Among his largest contributions are papers on the evolution of butterflies and moths. He also conducts research on ultrasound production and hearing in moths and echolocation in bats, which he works on with Dr. Jesse Barber. He has also published numerous papers on the importance of insects as models for nature education, including a highly popular article on the action items that every individual can do to help global insect declines.

Awards and recognition 

He has appeared in numerous films and television shows, including
Nature: "American Spring LIVE" (2019), Nature: "Nature's Sex, Lies, and Butterflies" (2018), David Attenborough's Conquest of the Skies 3D (2015), and Beetle Queen Conquers Tokyo (2009).

Personal life 
Kawahara was born in New York City, NY, USA. He is the son of modern Contemporary Artist, On Kawara. As a child, he traveled between New York and Tokyo annually, attending two schools simultaneously, a schooling called "Taiheiyou-tsugaku" (Trans-Pacific Commute). He resides in Florida and New York, and has two children.

Selected publications

References

External links 
 The Kawahara Lab
 
 

American entomologists
Lepidopterists
Living people
University of Florida faculty
University of Maryland, College Park alumni
Cornell University alumni
American people of Japanese descent
American academics of Japanese descent
1978 births
American lepidopterists
Scientists from New York City